In Yolngu mythology, Bamapana is a trickster god who causes discord.  He is obscene and profane and once committed incest, thus breaking a strict taboo.

References 

Australian Aboriginal gods
Trickster gods